Welling United Football Club are an English football club, based in Welling in the London Borough of Bexley.  The club was founded in 1963 and began as a youth team playing in the Eltham & District Sunday League on a park pitch from 1963-64 to 1970-71. From 1971-72 to 1974-75 they played in the Metropolitan-London League (Intermediate/Reserves) Division. In 1975-76 they played in the London Spartan League- Reserve Division 1. They gained senior status in the London Spartan League in 1976 at Butterfly Lane, Eltham. They finished 6th in Division 2 in 1976-77 and were promoted to the Premier Division. 1977-78 was their first season at Park View Road.  Welling United currently play in the National League South.

Key

Key to league record
 Level = Level of the league in the current league system
 Pld = Games played
 W = Games won
 D = Games drawn
 L = Games lost
 GF = Goals for
 GA = Goals against
 GD = Goals difference
 Pts = Points
 Position = Position in the final league table
 Top scorer and number of goals scored shown in bold when he was also top scorer for the division.

Key to cup records
 Res = Final reached round
 Rec = Final club record in the form of wins-draws-losses
 PR = Preliminary round
 QR1 (2, etc.) = Qualifying Cup rounds
 R1 (2, etc.) = Proper Cup rounds
 QF = Quarter-finals
 SF = Semi-finals
 RU = Runners-up
 W = Winners

Seasons

References

English football club seasons
Seasons